KTPZ (92.7 FM) is a commercial radio station located in Twin Falls, Idaho, broadcasting to the Magic Valley area.  KTPZ airs a Top 40/CHR music format branded as "The Music Monster". The call letters and the branding was previously used in Mountain Home, Idaho serving Boise with the all '80s Hits format, also on 99.1 FM (now the modern rock format with KQBL-HD2 as the call letters).

Previous logo
 (KTPZ's logo under former 99.1 FM frequency)

External links

TPZ
Contemporary hit radio stations in the United States